This article lists important figures and events in Malaysian public affairs during the year 2006, together with births and deaths of notable Malaysians.

Incumbent political figures

Federal level
Yang di-Pertuan Agong:
Tuanku Syed Sirajuddin to 12 December
Sultan Mizan Zainal Abidin
Raja Permaisuri Agong:
Tuanku Fauziah to 12 December
Sultanah Nur Zahirah
Prime Minister: Dato' Sri Abdullah Ahmad Badawi
Deputy Prime Minister: Dato' Sri Najib Tun Razak
Chief Justice: Ahmad Fairuz Abdul Halim

State level
 Sultan of Johor: Sultan Iskandar
 Sultan of Kedah: Sultan Abdul Halim Muadzam Shah (Deputy Yang di-Pertuan Agong)
 Sultan of Kelantan: Sultan Ismail Petra
 Raja of Perlis: Tuanku Syed Faizuddin Regent to 12 December
 Sultan of Perak: Sultan Azlan Shah
 Sultan of Pahang: Sultan Ahmad Shah
 Sultan of Selangor: Sultan Sharafuddin Idris Shah
 Sultan of Terengganu: Tengku Muhammad Ismail Regent to 13 December
 Yang di-Pertuan Besar of Negeri Sembilan: Tuanku Jaafar
 Yang di-Pertua Negeri (Governor) of Penang: Tun Abdul Rahman Abbas
 Yang di-Pertua Negeri (Governor) of Malacca: Tun Mohd Khalil Yaakob
 Yang di-Pertua Negeri (Governor) of Sarawak: Tun Abang Muhammad Salahuddin
 Yang di-Pertua Negeri (Governor) of Sabah: Tun Ahmad Shah Abdullah

Events
29 January – Tallest Lord Muruga statue in the world was unveiled at Batu Caves, Selangor and Sri Batumalai Murugan Temple was opened to pilgrims.
4 February – The Kepong Flyover on the Kuala Lumpur Middle Ring Road 2 (MRR2) was closed to traffic for repair works. It reopened in December.
18 February – The Federal Court unanimously decided that the Ampang Jaya Municipal Council (MPAJ), the Gombak District Council (MDG) or any local government had immunity and was protected under Section 95 (2) of the Road, Drainage and Building Act 1974 from any claim before the collapse of the Highland Towers apartment block. Tan Sri Steve Shim Lip Kiong, Datuk Abdul Hamid Mohamad and Datuk Arifin Zakaria decided that MPAJ was not responsible for losses before and after the condominium collapsed.
 27 February – Shah Alam, Selangor's state capital was hit by massive flash floods.
23 March – The LCCT, Malaysia's first budget air terminal in Sepang, Selangor was opened.
12 April – Construction of the new Tanjung Puteri road bridge replacing the Malaysian side of the causeway was canceled.
23 April – Tun Ghafar Baba, former deputy prime minister died. He was laid to rest at Makam Pahlawan, near Masjid Negara, Kuala Lumpur.
20 May – SUPP experienced its worst defeat since its establishment in 1959, winning only 11 out of 19 contested seats in the Sarawak elections.
31 May – Four people were killed in the landslide in Kampung Pasir, Ulu Klang, Selangor.
20 June – Petaling Jaya was granted city status, becoming the second municipality in Selangor with city rights after the state capital Shah Alam.
25 July – Tengku Datuk Puteri Kamariah Sultan Abu Bakar, sister of Sultan Ahmad Shah of Pahang was stabbed to death by her 21-year-old son Tunku Rizal Shahzan Tunku Ismail.
30 July – Eleven passengers were killed in a bus crash near the Jawi Interchange, Penang, on the North–South Expressway.
30 July – The South Johor Economic Region (SJER) was announced.
August – The Malaysian federal government unveiled plans to build the Penang Second Bridge in the Ninth Malaysia Plan.
20 August – The Federal Territory got a new flag and its own anthem.
21 August – Malaysian pop singer Siti Nurhaliza married Datuk Khalid Mohd Jiwa (Datuk K).
 4 September – Sheikh Muszaphar Shukor and Faiz Khaleed were announced as the first Malaysian angkasawan (cosmonauts).
7 September – The remains of two 19th-century Malay warriors Ngah Ibrahim and Laksamana Mohammad Amin Alang Duakap were brought back from Singapore to Perak.
22 September – Suki won One in a Million, a popular singing competition which offers prizes up to RM 1,000,000.
August–October – The 2006 Southeast Asian haze.
October – Mongolian model, Altantuya Shaaribuu was murdered in Shah Alam, Selangor.
27 October – A six-coach train of the Ampang Line LRT overshot the end of the elevated tracks at Sentul Timur station, resulting in the front half of the first coach dangling in the air about 25 meters above the ground.
November – Heavy showers hit Peninsular Malaysia daily for several weeks, unusual even during the rainy season in previous years.
4 November – The South Johor Economic Region (SJER) was officially named as Iskandar Development Region.
7 November – The KLCI passed the 1,000 mark hurdle, for the first time since 2000.
12 November – Ground-breaking ceremony for the new Penang Second Bridge.
20 November – Microchips worth millions of ringgit were stolen from the Air Cargo Complex in Batu Maung, Penang.
25 November–1 December – The 2006 FESPIC Games took place in Kuala Lumpur with 3,641 athletes from 46 nations competing. Malaysia rank at fourth place with total 175 medals. This was the last FESPIC Games event held before many Asian countries competed in the first 2010 Asian Para Games.
7 December – The Klang Valley metropolitan area was given MSC status by Prime Minister Abdullah Ahmad Badawi.
7 December – Cicak Man, Malaysia's locally produced superhero film, hit the screens.
12 December – The MEASAT III was launched by a Proton rocket from Baikonur Cosmodrome, Kazakhstan.
13 December – Sultan Mizan Zainal Abidin of Terengganu replaced Tuanku Syed Sirajuddin (of Perlis) as the 13th Yang di-Pertuan Agong.
15 December – Bok House, a 1920s bungalow along Jalan Ampang, Kuala Lumpur, was controversially demolished.
19 December – Several parts of Johor, Malacca and Pahang including Johor Bahru, Skudai, Segamat, Jasin and Kota Tinggi were hit by flash floods.

Births
 24 April – Aniq Iffat – Actor
 11 December – Aliff Idham – Actor

Deaths
20 January – Rosiah Chik – Malay singer
25 July – Hani Mohsin – Celebrity and the host of the TV gameshow Wheel of Fortune Malaysia version Roda Impian
17 August – Tan Sri Kontik Kamariah Ahmad – First women in the co-operative movement, education and politics
1 September – Rashid Maidin – Senior leader of the Communist Party of Malaya (CPM)
19 November – Tan Sri Mohamed Khir Johari – Former Minister of Education

See also
2006
2005 in Malaysia | 2007 in Malaysia
History of Malaysia
List of Malaysian films of 2006

References 

 
Years of the 21st century in Malaysia
Malaysia
Malaysia
2000s in Malaysia